Policy Sciences is a quarterly peer-reviewed academic journal covering issues and practices in the policy studies. It was established in 1970 and is published by Springer Science+Business Media on behalf of the Society of Policy Scientists. The editor-in-chief is Michael P. Howlett (Simon Fraser University).

Abstracting and indexing
The journal is abstracted and indexed in:

According to the Journal Citation Reports, the journal has a 2017 impact factor of 3.023, ranking it ninth out of 57 journals in the category "Planning and Development",
seventh out of 47 journals in the category "Public Administration", and fifth out of 98 journals in the category "Social Sciences, Interdisciplinary".

Editors-in-chief
The following persons are or have been editor-in-chief of the journal:

Harold Lasswell Prize 
Since 1984, the association has awarded the Harold Lasswell Memorial Prize for the best article published in the current volume of the journal. The prize selection committee usually is drawn from the editorial board and Springer Science+Business Media underwrites all expenses related to the prize.

See also 
 List of political science journals
 List of public administration journals

References

External links
 

Springer Science+Business Media academic journals
Quarterly journals
Political science journals
Publications established in 1970
English-language journals